Pentti Alonen (15 September 1925 – 28 November 2017) was a Finnish former alpine skier who competed in the 1948 Winter Olympics, in the 1952 Winter Olympics, and in the 1956 Winter Olympics.

References

1925 births
2017 deaths
Finnish male alpine skiers
Olympic alpine skiers of Finland
Alpine skiers at the 1948 Winter Olympics
Alpine skiers at the 1952 Winter Olympics
Alpine skiers at the 1956 Winter Olympics
20th-century Finnish people